Riders of the Lone Star is a 1947 American Western film directed by Derwin Abrahams and written by Barry Shipman. The film stars Charles Starrett, Virginia Hunter, Curly Williams and Smiley Burnette. The film was released on August 14, 1947, by Columbia Pictures.

Plot

Cast          
Charles Starrett as Steve Mason / The Durango Kid
Virginia Hunter as Doris McCormick
Curly Williams as Fiddle Player Pee Wee
Smiley Burnette as Smiley Burnette
Steve Darrell as Murdock
Edmund Cobb as Drake
Mark Dennis as Mike Morton
Lane Bradford as Rank
Ted Mapes as Slade
George Chesebro as Faro
Peter Perkins as Brock
Ed Parker as Sheriff Banning
Nolan Leary as Doc Jones

References

External links
 

1947 films
American Western (genre) films
1947 Western (genre) films
Columbia Pictures films
Films directed by Derwin Abrahams
American black-and-white films
1940s English-language films
1940s American films